Temitope Duker (born 22nd July 1978) is a Nigerian filmmaker and radio show host.

Personal life 
Born 22 July 1978, into the Olowogbowo neighborhood of Lagos Island Local Government of Lagos State. Temitope was born into the family of Hon. Ayodele Benjamin, one time Acting chairman of the old Lagos Island and Chairman Lagos Divisional Football Association, who later became a board member of Lagos State Sports Council.

Duker is married to Fidelis Duker, one of Nollywood’s early filmmakers and festival organizers; and they have three children together .

Career 
Temitope Duker started her career in the Nollywood industry as a filmmaker in 1997 after working as assistant producer on Nemesis, a project produced by her husband Fidelis and released the same year. Since then she has gone to produce and worked as director for several movies, with her latest being Carwash (2021), a movie that starred Lateef Adedimeji, Dayo Amusa, Eniola Ajao and Jide Kosoko.

In 2003, Duker joined her husband to found the Abuja International Film Festival (AIFF), acting as Festival Coordinator from 2003 to 2019, then acting as Festival Director in 2019.

Currently, Duker sits on the board as an executive director of the Fad Media Group owners of Fad FM 93.1 and Fad360 TV in Calabar and Lagos. Duker also hosts a radio show called Serenade With Boss lady.

Filmography

References 

Nigerian film directors
Nigerian women film directors
1978 births
Living people
Nigerian film producers
Nigerian radio presenters
Nigerian women radio presenters
Nigerian women film producers